was a railway station in Toyotomi, Teshio District, Hokkaidō, Japan. Only local trains serve this station. Station closed in March 2021.

Lines
Hokkaido Railway Company
Sōya Main Line Station W75

Layout
Tokumitsu Station has a single platform serving one track.

Gallery

Adjacent stations

References

Stations of Hokkaido Railway Company
Railway stations in Hokkaido Prefecture
Railway stations in Japan opened in 1926
Railway stations closed in 2021